The 2003–04 season was FC Dinamo București's 55th season in Divizia A. After building up a team again in 2003–04, Dinamo eliminated Shakhtar Donetsk in the first round of the UEFA Cup 2003–04 season. They went on to lose to Spartak Moscow in the second round.

In the Romanian League, against all odds, Dinamo won everything: the championships, the Romanian Cup, and the top goalscorer (Ionel Dănciulescu). Seen as the third favourite in the battle, after Rapid and Steaua, Dinamo had an excellent second part of the season, and two strikers, Dănciulescu and Claudiu Niculescu that scored together 37 goals. Dinamo had 14 wins at home, out of 15 games, the only defeat in front of their own fans being registered at the beginning of the season, against Rapid. Dinamo won the title with a game in hand, beating in the 29th round Apulum Alba Iulia, at home.

In the Romanian Cup final, Dinamo defeated Oţelul Galaţi at Cotroceni.

Results

UEFA Cup 

Qualifying round

First round

Second round

Squad 

Goalkeepers: Grégory Delwarte  (10 / 0); Uladzimir Hayew  (2 / 0); Cristian Munteanu (9 / 0); Ștefan Preda (11 / 0).
Defenders: Angelo Alistar (11 / 0); Cosmin Bărcăuan (27 / 4); Mugur Bolohan (1 / 0); Ovidiu Burcă (22 / 0); Adrian Iordache (25 / 2); Xavier Méride  (6 / 0); Samuel Okunowo  (2 / 0); Szabolcs Perenyi (15 / 0); Flavius Stoican (8 / 1); Dorin Semeghin (28 / 1).
Midfielders:  Dan Alexa (23 / 1); Ionuț Badea (16 / 0); Cristian Cigan (1 / 0); Cristian Ciubotariu (6 / 0); Alexandru Dragomir (1 / 0); Ștefan Grigorie (24 / 8); Sorin Iodi (1 / 0); Vlad Munteanu (18 / 2); Leonard Naidin (8 / 0); Florentin Petre (24 / 4); Iulian Tameș (26 / 1); Ianis Zicu (13 / 6).
Forwards: Ionel Dănciulescu (29 / 21); Claudiu Drăgan (8 / 0); Ciprian Marica (10 / 3); Claudiu Niculescu (28 / 16).
(league appearances and goals listed in brackets)

Manager: Ioan Andone.

Transfers 

New players: Gaev (FC Gomel), Alistar (Ceahlăul), Naidin (FC Oradea), Cigan (FC Oradea)

Left team: Cr.Munteanu (FC Național), Okunowo and Meride (contracts cancelled), Gregory Delwarte (Belgium), Bolohan (Universitatea Craiova), Iodi (Gloria Bistrița), Zicu (AC Parma), Marica (Shakhtar Donetsk)

References

External links 
 www.labtof.ro
 www.romaniansoccer.ro
 worldfootball.net

FC Dinamo București seasons
Romania
Romanian football championship-winning seasons